The English language expression silver spoon is synonymous with wealth, especially inherited wealth; someone born into a wealthy family is said to have "been born with a silver spoon in their mouth". As an adjective, "silver spoon" describes someone who has a prosperous background or is of a well-to-do family environment, often with the connotation that the person does not fully realize or appreciate the value of his or her advantage, its having been inherited rather than earned.

Historical uses 

Before the place setting became popular around the 18th century, people brought their own spoons to the table, carrying them in the same way that people today carry wallet and keys. In pre-modern times, ownership of a silver spoon was an indication of social class, denoting membership in the land-owning classes. In the Middle Ages, when farmers and craftsmen worked long hours and frequently got dirt under their fingernails, it was important to not be mistaken for a serf or escaped slave. Under these circumstances, a silver spoon served the functional equivalent of passport, driving license, and credit card. Since most members of the land-owning classes were smallhold farmers and craftsmen, the silver spoon was primarily a lower-middle-class cultural marker.

History in print 

The phrase "born with a silver spoon in his mouth" appeared in print in English as early as 1719, in Peter Anthony Motteux's translation of the novel Don Quixote: "Mum, Teresa, quoth Sancho, 'tis not all Gold that glisters [sic], and every Man was not born with a Silver Spoon in his Mouth." Because the phrase is used as a translation of a Spanish proverb with a different literal meaning (literally: "often where there are hooks [for hanging hams] there are no hams"), it seems that the phrase was already considered proverbial in English at the time.

The phrase next appears in a book of Scottish proverbs published in 1721, in the form "Every Man is no born with a Silver Spoon in his Mouth."

Variants 
There are similar expressions in other languages. For example, in Portuguese and Spanish, an expression translated as "born in a gold cradle" is equivalent to the English, "born with a silver spoon".

The term gold spoon is much less commonly used, but finds occasional use, such as the 1840 American Gold Spoon Oration criticizing then-president Martin Van Buren for his supposedly luxurious lifestyle. In some languages, like Swedish and Finnish, the common expression is gold spoon rather than silver spoon, although both can be used.

"Silver fork novels" are described by English professor Paola Brunetti to her husband Guido, in Donna Leon's fourth Commissario Guido Brunetti novel Death and Judgment aka A Venetian Reckoning (1995), chapter 22, as "books written in the eighteenth century, when all that money poured into England from the colonies, and the fat wives of Yorkshire weavers had to be taught which fork to use".

See also
 Apostle spoon
 Cignus
 Cochlearium
 Silver lining (idiom)
 Silver tongue
 Born in the purple
 Spoon class theory

References 

English-language idioms
Spoons
Wealth concentration